Telegraph Spring is an unincorporated community in Loudoun County, Virginia. Telegraph Spring lies to the south of Hamilton.

Telegraph Spring is named for a naturally occurring spring that still flows today.  A small metal pipe protrudes from the east side of Telegraph Springs Road (Route 611) just south of the intersection with Chappelle Hill Road.  The water that flows continuously from the pipe is the spring.  During the 2007 drought the spring has ceased to flow.

Telegraph Springs Road runs from Purcellville to Philomont.  It is also known as State Route 611 and is paved for approximately half the length with the southern half gravel and dirt.

Unincorporated communities in Loudoun County, Virginia
Washington metropolitan area
Unincorporated communities in Virginia